Desderi is a surname. Notable people with the surname include:

Claudio Desderi (1943–2018), Italian baritone and conductor
Elena Desderi (born 1967), Italian cross-country skier
Ettore Desderi (1892–1974), Italian composer